Sedam Airport  is a private airstrip located at Sedam, Karnataka, India. It is operated by the Vasavadatta Cement unit of the BK Birla Group. The airstrip was built in 1986.

References

Airports in Karnataka
Buildings and structures in Kalaburagi district
Transport in Kalaburagi district
Airports established in 1986
1986 establishments in Karnataka
20th-century architecture in India